In enzymology, an apiose 1-reductase is an enzyme that catalyzes the chemical reaction

D-apiitol + NAD+  D-apiose + NADH + H+

Thus, the two substrates of this enzyme are D-apiitol and NAD+, whereas its 3 products are D-apiose, NADH, and H+.

This enzyme belongs to the family of oxidoreductases, specifically those acting on the CH-OH group of donor with NAD+ or NADP+ as acceptor.  The systematic name of this enzyme class is D-apiitol:NAD+ 1-oxidoreductase. Other names in common use include D-apiose reductase, and D-apiitol reductase.

References

 
 

EC 1.1.1
NADH-dependent enzymes
Enzymes of unknown structure